KUBL-FM (93.3 MHz) is a radio station broadcasting a country format. Licensed to Salt Lake City, Utah, United States, it serves the Salt Lake City metropolitan area. In September 2022 “K-BULL-93"  rebranded itself as “93.3 The Bull“.The station's studios are located in South Salt Lake (behind the I-15/I-80 interchange) and its transmitter site is located southwest of the city on Farnsworth Peak in the Oquirrh Mountains.

History
The station was once known as KWHO-FM, which shared call signs with what is now KKAT. Prior to 1995, KUBL was also known as KLTQ-FM and then KLZX, which became a competitor to KRSP-FM and carried a classic hits format. On May 8, 1995 KLZX became KUBL, switching from classic rock to the current country format. On September 13, 2022, KUBL was rebranded as "93-3 The Bull".
 In January 2023, the Lexi and Banks morning show was dismissed.

Awards and nominations

References

External links

UBL-FM
Country radio stations in the United States
Cumulus Media radio stations
Radio stations established in 1965
1965 establishments in Utah